Thomas McNally, Baron McNally, PC (born  20 February 1943) is a British politician and a former Leader of the Liberal Democrats in the House of Lords.

Early life
McNally was born in Blackpool. A Catholic of Irish descent, he attended St Joseph's College, Blackpool. He later attended University College London, where he was elected president of the Debating Society as well as Students' Union President.

Professional career
He later worked for the Fabian Society, and then as a full-time employee of the Labour Party, becoming its international secretary. He served as a political advisor to Foreign Secretary, James Callaghan during the conflict in Cyprus in the 1970s, before becoming head of the Prime Minister's political office at Downing Street in 1976 when Callaghan succeeded Harold Wilson.

Political career
Elected to the House of Commons in 1979 as a member of the Labour Party for the constituency of Stockport South, in 1981 he was one of the later defectors to the new Social Democratic Party. Following constituency boundary changes for the 1983 general election McNally was the SDP candidate for the new constituency of Stockport, but finished in third place behind Labour and the Conservative victor, Tony Favell.

From 1993 he was Head of Public Affairs at Shandwick Consultants, and later non-executive vice-chairman of its successor Weber Shandwick.

On 18 November 1995 it was announced McNally would receive a life peerage. The Letters Patent were issued on 20 December and he took the title Baron McNally, of Blackpool in the County of Lancashire.

After being elected unopposed to succeed Baroness Williams of Crosby, he took office as Leader of the Liberal Democrats in the House of Lords at the beginning of the 2004/05 session of Parliament.

In January 2006, McNally was linked to the resignation of Charles Kennedy as leader of the Liberal Democrats, with critical comments regarding Kennedy's leadership of the party, and the effect that infighting was having on their electoral prospects in the upcoming local elections in May. McNally criticised Kennedy, suggesting that his style and content were lacklustre. Also in January 2006, McNally revealed in an interview that he had himself been alcohol dependent in the 1980s. He said, "I don't think the passing of a more boozy, ill-disciplined, ill-researched type of politics is to be regretted at all."

He has been President of the Stockport Liberal Democrat Constituency Party since 2007. In May 2010, following the formation of the Conservative-Liberal Democrat Coalition Government, Lord McNally was appointed Minister of State at the Ministry of Justice, under Kenneth Clarke.

In 2012 McNally justified the absence of an official pardon of mathematician Alan Turing on indecency charges, saying that Turing was rightly prosecuted under the UK's 1950s laws.

On 2 October 2013, Lord McNally announced he would be stepping down as leader of the Liberal Democrats in the House of Lords, saying it had been "an enormous privilege to serve as Leader of a Group which, by its discipline and cohesiveness has constantly punched above its weight".

Lord McNally resigned as Minister of State for Justice on 18 December 2013 following his appointment as Chair of the Youth Justice Board. He is a vice-president of the Debating Group.

Family
Lord McNally is married with two sons and one daughter.

See also
Liberal Democrat Frontbench Team

References

External links
Lord McNally profile at libdems.org.uk

1943 births
Living people
Alumni of University College London
Labour Party (UK) MPs for English constituencies
Liberal Democrats (UK) life peers
Macnally, Tom
UK MPs 1979–1983
British people of Irish descent
British Roman Catholics
Members of the Privy Council of the United Kingdom
Life peers created by Elizabeth II